Patric Bo Linus Blomdahl (born 30 January 1984) is a Swedish former professional ice hockey winger, who began and concluded his playing career for AIK of the Swedish Hockey League (SHL).

Blomdahl spent four years with Linköpings HC, winning Swedish Championship silver medals in each of his two last seasons, before signing a two-year contract with Frölunda HC in 2008. Blomdahl returned to AIK in 2010.

Career statistics

Regular season and playoffs

International

External links

1984 births
Living people
AIK IF players
Frölunda HC players
Linköping HC players
Nyköpings Hockey players
Swedish ice hockey forwards
Washington Capitals draft picks
Ice hockey people from Stockholm